Marco José Luciano (born September 10, 2001) is a Dominican professional baseball shortstop in the San Francisco Giants organization. He signed as an international free agent with the Giants in 2018.

Professional career

Minor leagues
Luciano was ranked as one of the top international prospects in his class. He signed with the San Francisco Giants in July 2018 as an international free agent out of the Dominican Republic for $2.6 million when he was 16 years old. He underwent hernia surgery the following month.

He made his professional debut with the Arizona League Giants in 2019. He led the league with 46 runs and batted .322/.438/.616 in 178 at bats, with 10 home runs (third in the league), 38 RBIs (4th), and 27 walks (7th). He ended the season as the youngest position player (age 17) in the Northwest League.  He was named an ACL post-season All Star, a Baseball America Rookie All Star, and an MiLB Organization All Star.

Luciano did not play a minor league game in 2020 due to the cancellation of the minor league season caused by the COVID-19 pandemic. Luciano started 2021 with the San Jose Giants  (Low-A). In June, Luciano was selected to play in the All-Star Futures Game. In August, Luciano was promoted to the Eugene Emeralds (High-A). 

In 2021, Luciano hit .258/.344/.471 in 453 plate appearances with 19 home runs and 71 RBIs. He was named a CAL post-season All Star, and an MiLB Organization All Star. He was selected to participate in the 2021 Arizona Fall League for the Scottsdale Scorpions, where he was the youngest player in the league.

In 2022 he played for Giants Black and Eugene. He hit .269/.350/.467 in 227 at bats, with 11 home runs and 36 RBIs. He missed half the season with a lower back injury. He was ranked # 1 in the Giants 2022 MLB Prospect Rankings.

Luciano was optioned to the Double-A Richmond Flying Squirrels to begin the 2023 season.

References

External links

2001 births
Living people
Dominican Republic baseball players
Baseball shortstops
Arizona League Giants players
Salem-Keizer Volcanoes players
San Jose Giants players
Eugene Emeralds players